Tygerberg Hospital is a tertiary hospital located in Parow. The hospital was officially opened in 1976 and is the largest hospital in the Western Cape and the second largest hospital in South Africa, with the capacity for 1899 beds. It acts as a teaching hospital in conjunction with the Stellenbosch University's Health Science Faculty. To become a patient at Tygerberg, a person must be referred by a primary or secondary health care facility. Over 3.6 million people receive health care from Tygerberg, either directly or via its secondary hospitals, such as Paarl and Worcester Hospital. During the normal working day there are about 10,000 people on hospital grounds.

Services

A full range of general specialist and sub specialist services include: 
 
 Carel du Toit Centre for the Hearing Impaired 
 Centre for Mental Health 
 Clinical Nutrition and Vitaminology Service 
 Clinical Retinal Laboratory 
 Cochlear Implant Unit 
 Complex Craniofacial Surgery Unit 
 Department of Endocrinology & Metabolism 
 Complex Radiation and Oncological Therapy 
 Day Surgery Unit 
 In-vitro Fertilisation 
 Kidney Transplant Unit 
 Laboratory for Human Genetics 
 Neonatal Intensive Care Unit 
 Neuropsychiatry Unit 
 Open Heart Surgery Unit 
 Perinatal Mortality Unit 
 Poison Information Centre 
 Postnatal Stress Disorder Unit 
 Specialised Pulmonary Function Laboratory 
 Tuberculosis Clinical Work Unit 
 TygerBear Unit – Social Work Unit 
 MRI with FMRI facility and additional a 3rd MRI machine 
 Oncology 
 Only Adult Burns Unit in the Western Cape 
 Hyperbaric Oxygen facility 
 26 bed Private Ward 
 
These services provide for advanced health care to all patients, as well as training of large numbers of doctors (under- and post-graduate) and all other types of clinical staff.

Coat of arms
The hospital registered a coat of arms at the Bureau of Heraldry in 1974 : Gules, on a mount Vert, a leopard statant erect Or,  armed  and  langued  Azure,  supporting  with  the forepaws  a  Staff  of Aesculapius erect Or; on a chief Argent, an antique lamp Azure enflamed Gules.  The arms were designed by Sheila Fort.

References

Hospitals in Cape Town
Teaching hospitals in South Africa